Scopula falsaria is a moth of the  family Geometridae. It is found in the Caucasus.

References

Moths described in 1852
falsaria
Moths of Europe
Moths of Asia